Chaetodermatida is an order of molluscs belonging to the class Caudofoveata.

Families:
 Chaetodermatidae
 Limifossoridae
 Prochaetodermatidae

References

Mollusc orders
Aplacophorans